Tingelstad is a village in the municipality of Gran in Innlandet county, Oppland, Norway.

Tingelstad may also refer to:
Tingelstad Old Church (Tingelstad gamle kirke), a 13th century stone church at Tingelstad in Norway
Tingelstad church (Tingelstad kirke), a 19th century stone church at Tingelstad in Norway

People with the surname
Bud Tingelstad (1928-1981), American race car driver, born in Frazee, Minnesota
Kathy Tingelstad (born 1958), American politician who represented district 49B in the Minnesota Legislature
Marit Tingelstad (born 1938), Norwegian politician for the Centre Party
Oscar Tingelstad (1882–1953), president of Pacific Lutheran University in Tacoma, Washington